Pompadour Bluff is a summit in the U.S. state of Oregon.

Pompadour Bluff was so named for a fancied resemblance to the pompadour hairstyle.

References

Mountains of Jackson County, Oregon
Mountains of Oregon